Midnite Dynamite  is the third studio album by American glam metal band Kix, released in 1985 by Atlantic Records. It features 7 out of 10 songs co-written by bassist Donnie Purnell with hit songwriter Bob Halligan Jr. (Kiss, Judas Priest, Icon, Blue Öyster Cult). Kip Winger was credited on one song and Crack the Sky frontman John Palumbo on three. Only one other Kix member contributed to the songwriting, Steve Whiteman on, "Sex."

Track listing 
Side one
 "Midnite Dynamite" (Donnie Purnell, Bob Halligan Jr.) – 3:51
 "Red Hot (Black & Blue)" (Purnell, Halligan Jr.) – 3:23
 "Bang Bang (Balls of Fire)" (Kip Winger, Purnell, Halligan Jr.) – 4:00
 "Layin' Rubber" (Purnell, Halligan Jr.) – 3:52
 "Walkin' Away" (Purnell, Halligan Jr., John Palumbo) – 4:56

Side two
 "Scarlet Fever" (Purnell, Halligan Jr.) – 4:20
 "Cry Baby" (Purnell, Halligan Jr.) – 4:17
 "Cold Shower" (Purnell, Palumbo) – 5:02
 "Lie Like a Rug" (Purnell, Palumbo) – 3:41
 "Sex" (Purnell, Steve Whiteman) – 3:56

Personnel 
Kix
 Steve Whiteman – lead vocals, harmonica, saxophone
 Ronnie "10/10" Younkins – guitars
 Brian "Damage" Forsythe – guitars
 Donnie Purnell – bass, keyboards, backing vocals, co-lead vocals on "Cold Shower"
 Jimmy "Chocolate" Chalfant – drums, percussion, backing vocals, co-lead vocals on "Cold Shower"

Additional musicians
 Anton Fig – drums, percussion on "Lie Like a Rug" and "Sex"
 Mike Slamer – guitars on "Walking Away" and "Scarlett Fever"
 Beau Hill – additional keyboards and guitars (courtesy of Chrysalis Records), producer, engineer

Production
Stephen Benben, Jim Faraci – engineers
Keith Lentin – producer on "Lie Like a Rug" and "Sex"
Bill Dooley – producer and engineer on "Lie Like a Rug" and "Sex"
Ed Garcia – engineer on "Lie Like a Rug" and "Sex"
Ira McLaughlin – assistant engineer on "Lie Like a Rug" and "Sex"
George Marino – mastering at Sterling Sound, New York
Bob Defrin – art direction
David Michael Kennedy – photography

References

External links
Kix Official Website
Guitar.com 2014 interview with Kix guitarist Brian Forsythe

1985 albums
Kix (band) albums
Albums produced by Beau Hill
Atlantic Records albums